Oakland, also known as the Dr. Garland Doty Murphy House, is a historic house at 3800 Calion Road in El Dorado, Arkansas.   It is a -story wood-frame structure resting on a brick foundation, with a gabled roof and clapboarded exterior.  A flat-roofed porch, two stories in height, extends across the front facade, supported by square box columns.  It has a symmetrical five-bay facade, with a center entrance surmounted by a semicircular pediment.  The house was built in 1939 to a design by David Weaver, and is a prominent local example of Colonial Revival architecture.

The house was listed on the National Register of Historic Places in 2019.

See also
National Register of Historic Places listings in Union County, Arkansas

References

Houses on the National Register of Historic Places in Arkansas
Houses completed in 1939
Houses in Union County, Arkansas
National Register of Historic Places in Union County, Arkansas
1939 establishments in Arkansas
Buildings and structures in El Dorado, Arkansas
Colonial Revival architecture in Arkansas